Robin Byström (born March 3, 1995) is a Swedish ice hockey player. He is currently playing with Borlänge HF of the Hockeyettan.

Byström played three games in the Swedish Hockey League for Modo Hockey during the 2013–14 SHL season.

References

External links

1995 births
Living people
Modo Hockey players
Swedish ice hockey left wingers
Västerviks IK players
People from Örnsköldsvik Municipality
Sportspeople from Västernorrland County